Manoj Kumar is a politician of Aam Aadmi Party.

Political career

Kumar won the seat, defeating the Dushyant Kumar Gautam of the Bharatiya Janata Party by 7490 votes in 2013 Delhi legislative assembly election from Kondli.

In 2015, Manoj Kumar was arrested in a case of alleged cheating and land grabbing. Kumar then complained of chest pain and was hospitalized, but AIIMS discharged him saying that he didn't need hospitalization.

References

Living people
Aam Aadmi Party politicians from Delhi
Delhi MLAs 2013–2015
Delhi MLAs 2015–2020
Crime in Delhi
Indian prisoners and detainees
Inmates of Tihar Jail
Year of birth missing (living people)